Anonymous Letters is a 1949 German drama film directed by Arthur Maria Rabenalt, and starring Käthe Haack, Tilly Lauenstein, and O.E. Hasse. It was shot at the Tempelhof Studios in West Berlin and on location in the city at the time of the Berlin Blockade. The film's sets were designed by the art director Willi Herrmann.

Synopsis
In Occupied Berlin the students at a drama school begin receiving anonymous letters threatening to reveal secrets about them. Considerable mistrusts grows amongst the students, culminating in one of them trying to kill themselves. Eventually the head of the school calls in the police to investigate.

Cast

References

Bibliography

External links 
 

1949 films
1949 drama films
German drama films
West German films
1940s German-language films
Films directed by Arthur Maria Rabenalt
Films set in Berlin
Films shot in Berlin
German black-and-white films
1940s German films
Films shot at Tempelhof Studios